Cecil McKaig (1885 – 4 July 1939) was a British cyclist. He competed in the tandem event at the 1908 Summer Olympics.

References

External links
 

1885 births
1939 deaths
English male cyclists
Olympic cyclists of Great Britain
Cyclists at the 1908 Summer Olympics
People from Chelsea, London
Cyclists from Greater London